Thys Nywerheid (pronounced, in Afrikaans, as Thays Nayvuhr-hate) is an alternative rock music project from Pretoria, South Africa.  The band's name is a wordplay on the Afrikaans name for Home Industry.  The music is a mixture of both Afrikaans and English but it leans predominantly towards the former. Thys Nywerheid is generally regarded by South African music critics as being one of the pioneers  in alternative Afrikaans music and is renowned for fusing electronic and rock music and also for their thought provoking  and satirical lyrics. They are also one of few rock bands that employs a full-time turntablist.

History
The band was started as an experimental music project in 2004 by multi-instrumentalist Dawid Kahts and most of the early recordings were sample-based electronic tracks featuring vocal samples of prominent public figures juxtaposed against hard rock guitar riffs.  One of these tracks used samples taken from a political radio advert for the now disbanded New National Party and another features a disgruntled dairy farmer complaining to the Eskom call centre about a power failure which resulted in his milk produce going sour.
Originally Kahts never intended the project to be commercial in any sense of the word but was persuaded in 2006 by musician Jamie Sharpe to start performing the music live. Sharpe subsequently joined the project as a DJ, turntablist and additional vocalist.
In 2008 Thys Nywerheid released their debut album Husse met lang messe with South African independent label OneF Records.  The album was received very favourably, especially by music critics and was nominated for a Huisgenoot Tempo award for the most progressive Afrikaans album of 2008.
In 2009 the band recorded and launched a music video of Snorcity , a song the band recorded as a tribute to South African music legend James Phillips aka Bernoldus Niemand. The video music was directed and produced to reflect the 1970s and is stylistically similar to the Quentin Tarantino film Death proof as well the Beastie Boys video for the song 'Sabotage'.
The band took a break in the first half of 2010 but is currently in the studio working on their second full-length album.

Current members
The current members of the band include Dawid Kahts on guitar, keyboard and lead vocals, DJ Jamie Sharpe on turntables and vocals, Martin Jooste on bass guitar and Werner van den Berg on drums.

Discography
Husse met lang messe (2008)
 Tsotsi
 Fear and loathing in Menlyn Mall
 Vir Funk en Vaderland
 Skade
 United States Of The World
 Mielie Praatjie
 Psychedelic Ossewa
 Die Kortbroek Vastrap
 Skelms En Dwelms
 Marie Johanna
 Bokkie Sokkie Skoppelmaai

Wit Geraas in Donker Dae (2013)

Brekfis in Orania (2017)

References

External links
 Official website
 Myspace website
 Facebook fanpage
 Thys Nywerheid on One-F music
 Snorcity music video on Youtube.com

South African alternative rock groups